Wayne Warren Williams (born January 19, 1963) is an American attorney and politician. A member of the Republican Party, he was the Secretary of State of Colorado from 2015 to 2019. Williams was elected to the Colorado Springs City Council At-Large in 2019.

Early life
Williams grew up in the Shenandoah Valley of Virginia. His father was the facilities manager of the National Zoo's Smithsonian Conservation Biology Institute, where Williams was raised.

In high school, Williams organized for local Republican Party candidates. He also served as a delegate at the Virginia Republican Party convention. He attended Brigham Young University (BYU) on the Harry S. Truman Scholarship, and graduated in 1985 with a bachelor's degree in political science. He graduated from the University of Virginia School of Law in 1989.

Career
Williams began practicing employment law and labor law in the Salt Lake City office of Holme Roberts & Owen. He was offered a job with Sherman & Howard in Colorado Springs, Colorado, which he accepted in 1992.

Bob Isaac, the mayor of Colorado Springs, appointed Williams to the city's Housing Authority board. Williams served for eight years as an El Paso County Commissioner. In 2010, Williams was elected the El Paso County Clerk & Recorder.

In 2014, Scott Gessler, the Secretary of State of Colorado, announced his candidacy for Governor of Colorado in the 2014 Colorado gubernatorial election. Williams ran unopposed for the Republican Party nomination for Secretary of State. He defeated Democratic Party nominee Joe Neguse in the general election, 47.5% to 44.9%.

On December 19, 2016 Michael Baca, a Colorado presidential elector, was replaced by Williams with Celeste Landry after Baca failed to vote for Hillary Clinton as he was pledged; Landry voted for Clinton.  Two Colorado electors filed suit against Williams in August 2017.

In 2023, Williams is a candidate for mayor of Colorado Springs.

Colorado Secretary of State
In 2017, Williams complied with Donald Trump's request by sending publicly available voter data to the Presidential Advisory Commission on Election Integrity.

Colorado followed nearly every recommendation made by election experts in the wake of Russian interference in the 2016 election prior to the 2018 elections.

On November 6, 2018, Williams lost re-election to Democrat Jena Griswold.

Personal life
Williams and his wife, Holly, met at BYU. They have four children: Sean, Greg, Lindsey, and Wendy.

Electoral history

Results

References

External links

Campaign website

1963 births
21st-century American politicians
Brigham Young University alumni
Colorado Republicans
Living people
People from the Shenandoah Valley
Politicians from Colorado Springs, Colorado
Secretaries of State of Colorado
University of Virginia School of Law alumni